Prey is a 2019 American horror film directed by Franck Khalfoun and written by David Coggeshall and Khalfoun. It stars Logan Miller and Kristine Froseth. Jason Blum is serving as a producer through his Blumhouse Productions banner and Ashok Amritraj is producing through his Hyde Park Entertainment banner.

The film was released via direct to video and select theaters on September 27, 2019, by Cinedigm.

Plot 
After being put on a supposedly uninhabited island as a form of behavioral rehabilitation, a high school senior finds that he is not alone on the island, and that getting discovered could be deadly.

Cast 
 Logan Miller as Toby Burns
 Joey Adanalian Young Toby
 Kristine Froseth as Madeleine
 Vela Cluff as Young Madeleine
 Jolene Anderson as Madeleine's mother
 Anthony Jensen as David Burns, Toby's father
 Phodiso Dintwe as Cameron
 Jerrica Lai as Kay

Production 
On June 9, 2016, Blumhouse Productions and Hyde Park Entertainment announced Franck Khalfoun would be directing the film with Logan Miller and Kristine Froseth set to star.

Filming
Principal photography on the film began in June 2016 in Malaysia, on the island of Langkawi, with the underwater scenes being shot on a soundstage. Three weeks of extensive reshoots were done in 2017 in California. According to Miller, different endings were considered, but were dropped during re-edits.

Release
Prey was released direct to video on demand and select theaters on September 27, 2019. The film was released on DVD on November 5, 2019.

Reception

References

External links 
 

2019 films
2010s teen horror films
American horror thriller films
Blumhouse Productions films
Demons in film
Films produced by Jason Blum
Films set on uninhabited islands
Universal Pictures films
2010s English-language films
2010s American films